Sunday Star may refer to:

 Daily Star (Louisiana), a daily newspaper in Hammond, Louisiana, United States
 Daily Star Sunday, a weekly newspaper in London, England, UK
 Sunday Morning Star, a weekly newspaper in Wilmington, Delaware, United States
 The Sunday Star, a weekly newspaper in Auckland, New Zealand; predecessor to the Sunday Star-Times
 The Washington Star, a daily newspaper in Washington, D.C., United States

See also

 Sunday Times-Star
 
 
 
 The Star on Saturday / The Saturday Star, special weekly edition of The Toronto Star daily newspaper in Toronto, Ontario, Canada
 Sunday (disambiguation)
 Star (disambiguation)